International Journal of Art and Design Education is a peer-reviewed academic journal published thrice annually by Wiley-Blackwell on behalf of The National Society for Education in Art and Design (NSEAD). The journal was established in 1982 as the Journal of Art & Design Education and became the International Journal of Art & Design in 2002. The journal publishes articles on topics such as the visual arts, creativity, crafts, design and art history in educational contexts and learning situations.

According to the Journal Citation Reports, the journal has a 2011 impact factor of 0.218, ranking it 181st out of 206 journals in the category "Education & Educational Research".

References

External links 
 

Wiley-Blackwell academic journals
English-language journals